The Celtic broadleaf forests are a terrestrial ecoregion that covers most of the islands of  Great Britain and Ireland.

Geography
The Celtic broadleaf forests occupy most of the islands of Great Britain and Ireland, including the Republic of Ireland and the United Kingdom countries of England, Scotland, Wales, and Northern Ireland. Portions of western Ireland and Scotland are in the North Atlantic moist mixed forests ecoregion, and the Scottish Highlands are in the Caledonian forest ecoregion. Southeastern and south-central England are in the English Lowlands beech forests ecoregion.

Climate
The climate of the forest is oceanic, leading to frequent precipitation, high precipitation days, high moisture and low sunshine levels; temperature extremes are rare. The combination of moisture and low evaporation (low sunshine amounts) leads to high dampness levels.

Flora
The principal plant communities include:
 lowland to submontane acidophilous oak forests,
 mixed oak forests, principally of English oak (Quercus robur) and sessile oak (Quercus petraea).
 mixed oak-ash forests.

Plant communities with smaller areas include:
 western boreal and nemoral-montane birch forests,
 fen and swamp forests,
 ombrotrophic mires in northern England and southern Scotland.

In addition to the two native oak species (Quercus robur and Q. petraea), broadleafed deciduous trees include common ash, silver birch, European aspen, and common elm.

Fauna
Animals known to inhabit the forests are as follows;
 Deer
 Red deer
 Roe deer
 European badger
 European hedgehog
 European otter
 Horseshoe bat
 Greater horseshoe bat
 Lesser horseshoe bat
 Red fox
 Stoat
 Weasel

Many other species once inhabited the forest; however, due to exploitation of natural resources, deforestation and hunting, many animals have become locally extinct. Many of these animals were once numerous across the British isles, including the grey wolf, brown bear, wild boar, Eurasian lynx, and European beaver.

Habitat status
Ninety percent of the Celtic forest habitat has been destroyed, generally over the last few thousand years, due to agriculture, fire-wood use and general deforestation. The outcome is an ecoregion which has not only lost most of its pristine cover, but which has been heavily degraded by fragmentation. The forests today are in a critical status, with the majority of the land having become the rolling pasture-hills typically associated with England.

Prehistory
This ecoregion is relatively young, having been buried under deep ice during the last glacial maximum. Human habitation began with Mesolithic peoples who were present shortly after the ice retreated,  years ago, scattered throughout the present-day English portion of the ecoregion, as well as in the Welsh, Irish, and eastern Scottish areas of the Celtic broadleaf forests.

Archeological evidence shows indigenous towns such as York had existed for a millennium prior to the Romans arriving, but the recorded history of the ecoregion begins with major Roman urban settlements established in the first century CE. Viking settlement in coastal areas of western Scotland, Wales, and eastern Ireland was widespread from at least the ninth century CE.

References

External link

Biota of England
Biota of Ireland
Biota of Scotland
Ecoregions of Ireland
Ecoregions of the United Kingdom
Forests and woodlands of England
Forests and woodlands of Scotland
Forests and woodlands of Wales
Natural history of Ireland
Temperate broadleaf and mixed forests